Nikita Zakharov (born  in Dmitrov) is a Russian bobsledder.

Zakharov competed at the 2014 Winter Olympics for Russia. He teamed with Nikolay Khrenkov, Petr Moiseev and Maxim Mokrousov in the Russia-3 sled in the four-man event, finishing 15th.

As of April 2014, his best showing at the World Championships is 11th, coming in the four-man event in 2012.

Zakharov made his World Cup debut in December 2012. As of April 2014, his best World Cup finish is 8th, in a four-man event at Winterberg in 2013-14.

References

1987 births
Living people
Russian male bobsledders
People from Dmitrovsky District, Moscow Oblast
Olympic bobsledders of Russia
Bobsledders at the 2014 Winter Olympics
Sportspeople from Moscow Oblast